Fateless (stylised in all caps) is the fifth studio album by Japanese rock band Coldrain. Recorded at Studio Barbarosa in Orlando, Florida with producer Michael "Elvis" Baskette, it was released on October 11, 2017 by Warner Music.

Fateless is the first Coldrain album to be released under the label of Warner Music Japan, following leaving Hopeless Records towards the backend of 2016, and also the first to not be released under the Japanese label VAP. This would be the follow-up since 2015's Vena, and be their second highest charting album on the Oricon Albums Chart, debuting and peaking at number 8, only behind The Revelation which peaked at number 7.

The album was home to three singles, "Envy", the lead single, which was released in the beginning of August, "Feed The Fire", on the 21st of the following month, as well as being the opening theme of the anime King's Game, and "R.I.P." in October, just three days after the release of Fateless. Coldrain would also ambitiously cover "Uninvited" by Alanis Morissette on this 12 track record that runs a little over 46 minutes.

Composition
The band's 2017 studio album Fateless has been described by critics as post-hardcore, metalcore, alternative metal, alternative rock, and hard rock.

Track listing
All lyrics written by Masato Hayakawa, all music composed by Masato Hayakawa and Ryo Yokochi, except where noted.

Personnel
Credits retrieved from album's liner notes.

Coldrain
  – lead vocals
  – lead guitar, programming, keyboards, synthesizers
  – rhythm guitar, guitar, backing vocals
  – bass guitar, backing vocals
  – drums, percussion

Additional personnel
 Michael Baskette – producer, mixing, arrangement
 Ted Jensen – mastering (Sterling Sound, NYC)
 Jeff Moll – recording engineer
 Kevin Thomas – assistant engineer

Charts

References

External links

2017 albums
Coldrain albums
Albums produced by Michael Baskette
Warner Music Group albums